Jonathan Gómez (born 19 April 1996) is a Colombian swimmer that competed at the 2016 Summer Olympics. Gomez swims for Southern Methodist University in Dallas, Texas where he holds the school's record in 3 events. Gomez placed 15th at the 2016 Rio Olympics and ranked 14th in the world at the 2016 Short Course World Championships in Windsor, Canada establishing a new Colombian National Record. He won the 200 butterfly at the 2016 Arena Pro Swim Series at Charlotte, North Carolina beating 2012 Olympic Gold Medalist Tyler Clary.

International career
 2013 World Junior Championships - Dubai United Arab Emirates 14th place - 200 meter butterfly 
 2014 Youth Olympic Games in Nanjing-China placed 8th in the world
 2014 Speedo Sectional Championships Winner - Orlando, Buffalo & College Station)
 2015 Arena Pro Swim Series Champion in the 200 meter butterfly 
 2016 Caribbean Island Swimming Championships in the Bahamas - Champion 200 meter butterfly
 2016 Short Course World Championships in Canada
 2017 World Championships in Budapest, Hungary placed 14th in the world
 2017 World Cup - Moscow, Russia - placed 6th 
 2017 World Cup - Berlin, Germany - placed 4th
 2017 World Cup - Netherlands - placed 5th
 2017 Bolivarian Games Champion - 200 meter butterfly & 400 IM

References

External links

1996 births
Living people
Sportspeople from Cali
Colombian male swimmers
Olympic swimmers of Colombia
Swimmers at the 2016 Summer Olympics
Swimmers at the 2019 Pan American Games
Swimmers at the 2014 Summer Youth Olympics
Pan American Games medalists in swimming
Pan American Games bronze medalists for Colombia
Central American and Caribbean Games medalists in swimming
Central American and Caribbean Games gold medalists for Colombia
Competitors at the 2018 Central American and Caribbean Games
Medalists at the 2019 Pan American Games
SMU Mustangs men's swimmers
Saint Peter's University alumni
21st-century Colombian people